Anfión Muñoz Muñoz (1850 – c. 1920) was a Chilean political figure, who served as the country's Minister of Industry and Public Works in 1904.

He was born in Chillán in 1850, the son of Francisco Muñoz and of Clorinda Muñoz. He completed his studies at the Instituto Nacional and graduated as a lawyer from the Universidad de Chile on June 10, 1875, marrying Isabel Lamas Benavente on April 24 of the same year.

Also in 1875, Muñoz was named secretary of the municipality of Bio Bio. He later became intendant of Valdivia from 1881 to 1884, Talca from 1884 to 1886, Tarapacá from 1886 to 1887, and Coquimbo from 1887 to 1889. President José Manuel Balmaceda named him General Inspector of Colonization in 1889. As a member of the Partido Radical, he was elected as a deputy for Antofagasta, Taltal, and Tocopilla in 1897, and in 1900 he was elected as a deputy for Temuco and Imperial.

Under President Germán Riesco, he was served as Minister of Industry and Public Works from June 1, 1904, to October 30, 1904.

Muñoz was also part of the Education and Welfare Commission and the Internal Police Commission.

References

External links
Official biography 

Members of the Chamber of Deputies of Chile
Radical Party of Chile politicians
Chilean Ministers of Public Works
Instituto Nacional General José Miguel Carrera alumni
University of Chile alumni
People from Chillán
Chilean people of Spanish descent
1850 births
1920 deaths